Winifred is an unincorporated community in Johnson County, Kentucky, United States. It is located at an elevation of 840 feet (256 m). Winifred is located in the ZIP Code Tabulation Area for ZIP code 41219, which includes the nearby community of Flat Gap.

References

Unincorporated communities in Johnson County, Kentucky
Unincorporated communities in Kentucky